The following is a list of Native American podcasts that are either created by or about indigenous peoples of the Americas.

List

See also 

 Indigenous music of North America
 Native Americans in film
 Native American fashion
 Indigenous cuisine of the Americas

References

External links 
 on Player FM

Native American
Podcasts